Alkon is a Russian alcoholic beverage manufacturer.

Alkon may also refer to:

 Amy Alkon (born 1964), American advice columnist and author
 David Alkon (born 1937), Mexican former sports shooter

See also
 Alcon (disambiguation)
 Alkan (disambiguation)
 Alken (disambiguation)
 Alkin